Ellanderroch (Scottish Gaelic: Eilean Darach/Eilean nan Darach meaning "oak island") is an island in Loch Lomond in Scotland.

It is a very small island, 100 metres in breadth at its widest point.  It lies a short distance to the south-west of the larger island of Inchfad.

The island has been used as a shelter for fishermen. There are many oaks left on the small island; a hollow one was filled in with concrete, but was struck by lightning, and now only the concrete remains.

References

External links
article which mentions it
 https://web.archive.org/web/20090710015304/http://lochlomond-islands.com/

Islands of Loch Lomond
Uninhabited islands of Stirling (council area)